Rasmutis Višinskis (born 12 October 1957) is a Soviet sprint canoeist who competed in the early 1980s. At the 1980 Summer Olympics in Moscow, he was eliminated in the semifinals of the K-1 1000 m event.

References
Sports-Reference.com profile

1957 births
Canoeists at the 1980 Summer Olympics
Living people
Olympic canoeists of the Soviet Union
Soviet male canoeists
Russian male canoeists